Super Monsters is a children's animated television series that premiered on Netflix on October 13, 2017. The series is about a group of preschool kids, whose parents are the world's most famous monsters, trying to master their special powers while preparing for kindergarten.

Super Monster Save Halloween was released on October 5, 2018. Super Monsters and the Wish Star was released on Netflix December 7, 2018. Super Monsters Furever Friends was released on April 16, 2019. Super Monsters Back to School was released on August 16, 2019. Super Monsters: Vida's First Halloween was released on October 4, 2019. Super Monsters Save Christmas was released on November 26, 2019. Super Monsters The New Class was released on August 1, 2020.

The series made its linear debut on Discovery Family on October 19, 2019.

Characters

Monsters 
 Cleo Graves: Four-year-old student at Pitchfork Pines Preschool who is a Mummy with the power to create sandstorms and tornadoes (voiced by Elyse Maloway).
 Drac Shadows: Four-year-old student at Pitchfork Pines Preschool who is a Vampire with the ability to fly. He is the first one to transform into a monster. In Borrowed Trouble, He said "Sun down..." . (voiced by Vincent Tong).
 Frankie Mash.: Four-year-old student at Pitchfork Pines Preschool who is a Frankenstein monster with super strength, and a super stomp (voiced by Erin Mathews).
 Katya Spelling: Four-year-old student at Pitchfork Pines Preschool who is a young Witch, often struggling with her spellcasting (voiced by Andrea Libman).
 Lobo Howler: Three-year-old student at Pitchfork Pines Preschool who is a Werewolf with super speed (voiced by Alessandro Juliani).
 Zoe Walker: Four-year-old student at Pitchfork Pines Preschool who is a Zombie with zombie vision, the ability to walk and see through walls and other objects (voiced by Nicole Anthony).
 Spike Gong: Three-year-old student at Pitchfork Pines Preschool who is a Dragon and is able to control clouds (voiced by Diana Kaarina).
 Vida Calavera: Lobo's cousin who is a Skeleton from Ciudad Monstruo and has plant magic, the ability to make plants grow (voiced by Gigi Saul Guerrero)
 Olive: who is an Ogre with Frankie's powers (voiced by Elicia Mackenzie). 
 Rocky: who is a stone Gargoyle, often struggles with flying and changes his color based on his feelings (voiced by Asia Mattu).
 Sami Snow: who is a Snow creature and has snow magic (voiced by Diana Kaarina).
 Zane Walker: Zoe's brother who is a zombie with zombie vision, the ability to move objects he sees with the point of his finger (voiced by Rukiya Bernard).

Teachers 
 Igor: Teacher at Pitchfork Pines Preschool with Esmie (voiced by Ian James Corlett)
 Esmie: Igor's granddaughter (voiced by Britt McKillip)
 Miss Mina: She is the current teacher for the new class of Super Monsters. She is also a Monster herself, which is currently unknown but does show off a beautiful rainbow colored pair of wings that enable her to fly (voiced by Nicole Anthony)
 Glorb: A Hamster that is a Classroom pet (voiced by Kathleen Barr)

Monster Parents 
 Mr. Mash Sr.: Frankie's dad (voiced by Brian Drummond)
 Mary Mash: Frankie's mom and Mr. Mash's wife
 Count Dracula Shadows Sr.: Drac's dad (voiced by Edward Foy)
 Cleopatra Graves Sr.: Cleo, Dog and Meggy’s mom (voiced by Nicole Oliver)
 Amy Spelling: Katya's mom (voiced by Elishia Perosa)
 Olive's Mom: (voiced by Elicia Mackenzie)
 Doyle the Gargoyle: Rocky's uncle (voiced by Ian James Corlett)
 Mrs. Snow: Sami's mom (voiced by Elyse Maloway)

Episodes

Season 1 (2017)

Season 2 (2018)

Specials (2018)

Season 3 (2019)

Specials (2019)

Specials (2020)

Specials (2021)

Other Super Monsters Shows

Super Monsters Monster Party 
Super Monsters Monster Party was released on Netflix and Disney Junior (Canada and Singapore on September 14, 2018, consisting of four episodes.

Super Monsters Monster Pets 
Super Monsters Monster Pets was released on Netflix on June 7, 2019, consisting of five episodes.

References

External links 
 at Netflix

2017 American television series debuts
2017 Canadian television series debuts
2021 American television series endings
2021 Canadian television series endings
2010s American animated television series
2020s American animated television series
2010s American children's television series
2020s American children's television series
2010s Canadian animated television series
2020s Canadian animated television series
2010s Canadian children's television series
2020s Canadian children's television series
2010s preschool education television series
2020s preschool education television series
American children's animated horror television series
American computer-animated television series
American preschool education television series
Animated preschool education television series
Canadian children's animated horror television series
Canadian computer-animated television series
Canadian preschool education television series
English-language Netflix original programming
Animated television series about children
Animated television series about monsters
Netflix children's programming
Animated television series by Netflix